Alesis Fusion is a music production workstation produced by Alesis introduced in early 2005. It uses four different types of synthesis: sample and synthesis, virtual analog, FM and physical modeling. It includes sampling capability through analog inputs and importing audio samples from a computer or memory card.

Models
The workstation is available in two models.  The Fusion 6HD is a sixty-one note semi-weighted keyboard workstation.  The Fusion 8HD is an eighty-eight note weighted keyboard workstation.  The two models are identical aside from the keyboard type. It competes with the Korg Triton, the Yamaha Motif and the Roland Fantom-X.

References

External links 
 Official Alesis site 
 Electronic Musician magazine review
 Keyboard Magazine Review
 Fusionzone - The Unofficial Alesis Fusion Support Page

Music workstations
Alesis synthesizers
Polyphonic synthesizers